Helena Lloret Gómez (born June 25, 1992) is a Spanish water polo player who won the silver medal at the 2017 World Championshipsin Budapest.

In 2018 she won the gold medal at the Mediterranean Games in Tarragona and the bronze at the European Water Polo Championship in Barcelona.

See also
 List of World Aquatics Championships medalists in water polo

References

External links
 
 

Spanish female water polo players
Living people
1992 births
World Aquatics Championships medalists in water polo
Mediterranean Games gold medalists for Spain
Mediterranean Games medalists in water polo
Competitors at the 2018 Mediterranean Games
21st-century Spanish women